Gorse is a genus of about 20 species of evergreen shrubs in the subfamily Faboideae of the pea family Fabaceae.

Gorse may also refer to:

 Georges Gorse (1915-2002), French politician and diplomat
 Gorse Trilogy, a series of novels by  Patrick Hamilton
 Gorse (Aveyron), a hamlet in the commune (municipality) of Thérondels, department Aveyron, France. 
 "Gorse", the entrance music for The Highlanders, a WWE tag team, from the WWE The Music, Vol. 7 album
 Gorses, a commune in the Lot department in south-western France.

See also
 Gorse Hall
 Gorse Hill
Gorce (disambiguation)